Mujahid Barelvi, is a Pakistani journalist. As of 2015, he appeared on a daily show, Doosra Pehlu, for CNBC Pakistan. He has traveled extensively worldwide.

Mujahid Barelvi was the first Pakistani journalist to enter Kabul in 1979, after the Soviet invasion. He was secretary of the Karachi Press Club for two years during the late 1980s. He has written articles for political journals and newspapers and has authored six books on Afghanistan and Baluchistan. As a progressive writer and publisher, he founded various magazines. He founded Sonehra Daur Karachi in the 1980s. Bankari was a monthly magazine that covered economics and politics of Pakistan.

Book on Habib Jalib
In November 2011, Mujahid Barelvi wrote and launched a book in the memory of his friend and revolutionary poet Habib Jalib called Jalib Jalib published by Jumhoori Publications. This book was launched at Karachi Arts Council with the prominent Pakistani poet Iftikhar Arif as the chief guest.

Mujahid Barelvi gave insights into Jalib's poetry, personality, political struggle and personal life. In this book, Mujahid Barelvi also wrote about his friendship with Habib Jalib, and published almost all of his poems in this book with their history, what inspired Jalib to write his poems and what his intentions and inspirations behind his poems were. Veteran journalist Masood Ashar commented that TV journalists were supposed to be tolerant and good listeners, and unlike the TV anchor persons seen today, he had never seen Mujahid Barelvi shouting at his guests or imposing himself on them.

In January 2012, the same above book Jalib Jalib by Mujahid Barelvi was launched at Alhamra Arts Council, Lahore with a lot of fanfare and many prominent personalities present on the occasion including veteran journalists Munnu Bhai, Abid Hassan Minto and I. A. Rehman. Munnu Bhai complimented Mujahid Barelvi for having paid off the debt that he owed to Habib Jalib as a friend by writing this book.

Mujahid Barelvi has written several book reviews on Habib Jalib's Urdu poems in The Friday Times (weekly newspaper in Pakistan).

See also
 List of Pakistani journalists
 Habib Jalib (a friend of Mujahid Barelvi)

References

He worked with different TV channel as host of program and write articles on political situation in various news paper and news websites. 

Pakistani male journalists
Pakistani writers
Living people
Year of birth missing (living people)
Place of birth missing (living people)
Journalists from Karachi
Pakistani television journalists
People from Bareilly